Renville County is a county in the U.S. state of North Dakota. As of the 2020 census, the population was 2,282. Its county seat is Mohall.

Renville County is part of the Minot, ND Micropolitan Statistical Area. It is located south of the Canada–United States border with Saskatchewan.

History
The Dakota Territory legislature created the county on January 4, 1873. It was named for Joseph Renville, an influential fur trader, interpreter, translator, and important figure in dealings between white men and the Sioux. The county was not organized at that time, nor was it attached to another county for administrative or judicial purposes. The proposed county boundaries were altered in 1883, in 1885, and 1887, and on November 8, 1892, the county was dissolved and absorbed into Bottineau and Ward counties due to a lack of settlement.

The general election held November 3, 1908 included a question asking whether a portion of Ward County should be partitioned off and named Renville County (covering a different area than the original county). This question reportedly failed to pass, but it was promptly contested in court, resulting in a ruling by the state Supreme Court ruled on June 3, 1910, that the split should be carried out. The state governor proclaimed the result in a July 12 proclamation, and the county government was organized on July 20 of that year, with Mohall as the county seat.

Geography
Renville County lies on the north line of North Dakota; its north boundary line abuts the south boundary line of Canada. The Souris River flows southeasterly through the county on its way to Hudson Bay. The county terrain consists of rolling hills, largely devoted to agriculture. The terrain slopes to the south and east; its highest point is its SW corner, at 2,005' (611m) ASL.

Major highways

  U.S. Highway 52
  U.S. Highway 83
  North Dakota Highway 5
  North Dakota Highway 28

Adjacent counties and rural municipalities

 Mount Pleasant No. 2, Saskatchewan - northwest
 Argyle No. 1, Saskatchewan - northeast
 Bottineau County - east
 McHenry County - southeast
 Ward County - south
 Burke County - west

Protected areas
 Upper Souris National Wildlife Refuge (part)
 Upper Souris Wildlife Refuge

Lakes
 Lake Darling (part)

Demographics

2000 census
As of the 2000 census, there were 2,610 people, 1,085 households, and 748 families in the county. The population density was 2.98/sqmi (1.15/km2). There were 1,413 housing units at an average density of 1.61/sqmi (0.62/km2). The racial makeup of the county was 97.74% White, 0.23% Black or African American, 0.65% Native American, 0.46% Asian, 0.11% from other races, and 0.80% from two or more races. 0.73% of the population were Hispanic or Latino of any race. 41.8% were of Norwegian, 25.7% German and 5.6% Irish ancestry.

There were 1,085 households, out of which 28.70% had children under the age of 18 living with them, 60.40% were married couples living together, 5.60% had a female householder with no husband present, and 31.00% were non-families. 28.50% of all households were made up of individuals, and 14.70% had someone living alone who was 65 years of age or older. The average household size was 2.35 and the average family size was 2.90.

The county population contained 23.30% under the age of 18, 4.90% from 18 to 24, 24.40% from 25 to 44, 25.30% from 45 to 64, and 22.00% who were 65 years of age or older. The median age was 44 years. For every 100 females there were 100.30 males. For every 100 females age 18 and over, there were 101.70 males.

The median income for a household in the county was $30,746, and the median income for a family was $36,023. Males had a median income of $25,346 versus $16,700 for females. The per capita income for the county was $16,478. About 8.50% of families and 11.00% of the population were below the poverty line, including 14.10% of those under age 18 and 9.10% of those age 65 or over.

2010 census
As of the 2010 census, there were 2,470 people, 1,061 households, and 685 families in the county. The population density was 2.82/sqmi (1.09/km2). There were 1,386 housing units at an average density of 1.58/sqmi (0.61/km2). The racial makeup of the county was 97.9% white, 0.4% American Indian, 0.2% Asian, 0.1% black or African American, 0.2% from other races, and 1.2% from two or more races. Those of Hispanic or Latino origin made up 1.0% of the population. In terms of ancestry, 39.5% were German, 39.1% were Norwegian, 11.6% were Irish, 9.7% were English, 9.5% were Swedish, and 2.3% were American.

Of the 1,061 households, 25.8% had children under the age of 18 living with them, 56.7% were married couples living together, 5.1% had a female householder with no husband present, 35.4% were non-families, and 30.9% of all households were made up of individuals. The average household size was 2.28 and the average family size was 2.85. The median age was 45.4 years.

The median income for a household in the county was $49,583 and the median income for a family was $63,068. Males had a median income of $39,950 versus $25,469 for females. The per capita income for the county was $26,856. About 3.8% of families and 5.9% of the population were below the poverty line, including 5.9% of those under age 18 and 9.6% of those age 65 or over.

Communities

Cities

 Glenburn
 Grano
 Loraine
 Mohall (county seat)
 Sherwood
 Tolley

Unincorporated communities

 Chola
 Greene
 Grover
 Norma
 Rockford
 White Ash

Townships

 Brandon
 Callahan
 Clay
 Colquhoun
 Eden Valley
 Ensign
 Fairbanks
 Grassland
 Grover
 Hamerly
 Hamlet
 Hurley
 Ivanhoe
 Lockwood
 McKinney
 Muskego
 Plain
 Prescott
 Prosperity
 Rockford
 Roosevelt
 Stafford
 Van Buren
 White Ash

Politics
Renville County voters have voted Republican in every national election since 1976 (as of 2020).

See also
 National Register of Historic Places listings in Renville County, North Dakota

References

External links
 Renville County official website
 Renville County North Dakota History website
 Renville County maps, Sheet 1 (northern) and Sheet 2 (southern), North Dakota DOT

 
Minot, North Dakota micropolitan area
1910 establishments in North Dakota
Populated places established in 1910